National Tertiary Route 331, or just Route 331 (or ) is a National Road Route of Costa Rica, located in the San José, Puntarenas provinces.

Description
In San José province the route covers Pérez Zeledón canton (Pejibaye district).

In Puntarenas province the route covers Buenos Aires canton (Colinas district).

References

Highways in Costa Rica